Saheba Subramanyam is a 2014 Indian Telugu-language film starring newcomer Dilip Kumar and Priya Gor (in her Telugu debut). It is a remake of the 2012 Malayalam film Thattathin Marayathu. This film was directed by Sasi Kiran Narayana who is the daughter of actor M. S. Narayana.

Cast 
 Dilip Kumar as Subramanyam Sastry
 Priya Gor as Ayesha
 Rao Ramesh as a police officer
 Raghavendra as Subramanyam's friend
Purnima
 Nagineedu
 Thagubothu Ramesh
 Kondavalasa

Soundtrack 
Apart from two songs, Shaan Rahman resused the songs from Thattathin Marayathu.

Reception 
A critic from The Times of India rated the film 1.5 out of 5, saying, "This movie tests your patience and gets on to your nerves. If you love challenges, accept this. If you shy away from this challenge, you are simply being wise." A critic from 123telugu rated the film 2.75 out of 5, saying, "On the whole, Saheba Subramanyam is a decent attempt from a debut director".

References

External links
 

2014 films
2010s Telugu-language films
Telugu remakes of Malayalam films
Indian romantic musical films
Films scored by Shaan Rahman